The Chinese Ambassador to Romania is the official representative of the People's Republic of China to Romania.

List of representatives

See also 
China–Romania relations
List of ambassadors of Romania to China

References 

 
Romania
China